Antonio Šančić (born 23 November 1988, in Samobor) is professional Croatian tennis player. He is playing mostly on the ATP Challenger Tour.

ATP career finals

Doubles: 3 (3 runner-ups)

Challenger and Futures Finals

Singles: 4 (2–2)

Doubles: 65 (30 titles, 35 runners-up)

References

Sources
 
 
 Main draw notability in doubles in 2006

Living people
1988 births
Croatian male tennis players